The Destruction of the Thracian Bulgarians in 1913 (Razorenieto na trakiyskite balgari prez 1913 g., also translated as "The Devastation" or "The Ruin of the Thracian Bulgarians in 1913") is a book published by the Bulgarian academic Lyubomir Miletich in 1918, which describes the mass extermination and ethnic cleansing of the Bulgarian population in Eastern Thrace (now mainly in Edirne Province, Kırklareli Province and Tekirdağ Province in Turkey and Eastern Rhodope Mountains in Evros Prefecture in Greece) during the Second Balkan War and in a short period after it. On the other hand, Bulgarian Turks, Pomaks and Muslim Roma from Northern Thrace in Bulgaria, were expelled and settled in the whole Eastern Thrace in 1913.

Content
When the military actions between Serbia, Greece, Montenegro and Romania against Bulgaria were in full progress, the Ottoman Empire took advantage of the situation to recover some of its former possessions in Thrace including Adrianople. In the beginning of July 1913 its forces crossed the Bulgarian border on the line Midiya-Enos, settled by the Treaty of London in May 1913. Because the Bulgarian troops had all been allocated to the front with Serbia and Greece, the Ottoman armies suffered no combat casualties and moved northwards and westwards without battles. Thus reoccupied territories were given back to the Ottoman Empire by the Treaty of Constantinople, signed on September 16. Despite that, the mass extermination and ethnic cleansing continued in the areas controlled by the Ottomans even after this date. Shortly after the end of the hostilities, the author interviewed hundreds of refugees from these regions, travelled himself in the places where these tragic events happened and systematically depicted in detail the atrocities, committed by the Young Turks' regular army, Ottoman paramilitary forces and partly by local Greeks. As a result of this violent process, approximately 200,000 Bulgarians were killed or forced to leave their homes and properties forever, seeking salvation in territories, controlled by Bulgarian army and paramilitary formation Internal Macedonian Adrianople Revolutionary Organization. Ottoman military campaign lasted for a mere 3 weeks from 20 July 1913 to 10 August 1913. According to Carnegie Commission 15.960 Bulgarians were "either killed burned in the houses or scattered among the mountains" and several thousands more were massacred in Western Thrace within this period. There were also Bulgarians in Anatolia concentrated around Marmara Region. A number of them during this period after the exchange agreements between the Kingdom of Bulgaria and Ottoman Empire after the Second Balkan War left while there were still 6,587 Bulgarians in Marmara Region. The deportation of Thracian Bulgarians was signified with the exchange treaty where 46.764 Eastern Thracian Orthodox Christian Bulgarians and 48.570 Muslims (Turks, Pomaks, and Muslim-Roma) from Northern Thrace were exchanged. After the exchange, in 1914 there still remained 14,908 Bulgarians belonging to the Bulgarian Exarchate in Ottoman Empire, 2.502 in Edirne, including the area that was ceded to Bulgaria in 1915, 3,339 in Constantinople and its environs and 338 in Çatalca. Their descendants in contemporary Bulgaria are about 800,000 people.

Population estimates
Alongside the 1911 official Ottoman figures, Lyubomir Miletich made the following estimates of the ethnic composition, using linguistic criteria rather than religious affiliation:

The Ottoman authorities divided the population by religion, so all Patriarchists were counted as Greeks and the Pomaks as Muslims. The other two sources divided the population by language, so for example 24,970 Bulgarian patriarchists and 1700 Uniates were added by Miletich to the total figure for Orthodox Bulgarians.

Illustrations

Footnotes

External links
On-line publication of the phototype reprint of the first edition of this book in Bulgarian here (in Bulgarian "Разорението на тракийските българи през 1913 година", Българска академия на науките, София, Държавна печатница, 1918 г.; II фототипно издание, Културно-просветен клуб "Тракия" – София, 1989 г., София; in English: "The Destruction of Thracian Bulgarians in 1913", Bulgarian Academy of Sciences, Sofia, State printing house, 1918; II phototype edition, Cultural and educational club "Thrace" – Sofia, 1989, Sofia).

Bulgarian books
History books about ethnic groups
History books about the 20th century
History books about wars
Non-fiction crime books
1918 non-fiction books
Second Balkan War